Federal Trade Commission v. Meta Platforms, Inc. (formerly Federal Trade Commission v. Facebook, Inc.) is an ongoing antitrust court case brought by the Federal Trade Commission (FTC) against Facebook parent company Meta. Filed in conjunction with 46 states, the lawsuit alleges that Meta has accumulated monopoly power via anti-competitive mergers, with the suit centering on the acquisitions of Instagram and WhatsApp.

Background and initial filing 
The case centers on Meta acquisition of Facebook's two former competitors—Instagram and WhatsApp. The FTC alleges that Meta holds monopolistic power in the US social networking market and seeks to force the company to divest from Instagram and WhatsApp to break up the conglomerate. The Federal Trade Commission said that Meta's actions prevent consumers from enjoying the benefits of competition.

On December 8, 2020, the Federal Trade Commission, along with 46 US states (all excluding Alabama, Georgia, South Carolina, and South Dakota), the District of Columbia and the territory of Guam, launched the antitrust lawsuit against Meta.

Proceedings 

On June 28, 2021, the U.S. District Court for the District of Columbia dismissed the FTC's complaint, as legally insufficient.  A December 2021 New Yorker profile of Lina Khan, the Biden-appointed head of the FTC, describes the court's decision as "a harsh criticism of how Khan's predecessors [the Trump-appointed FTC Commissioners] had written their complaint." According to the article, the decision argued that the FTC "had provided no proof for its assertion that Facebook held a monopoly position in social networking, but, instead, seemed to assume that everyone simply saw it that way."

However, following a new amended complaint from the FTC on August 19, 2021, presiding judge James E. Boasberg, denied Meta's motion to dismiss the case on January 11, 2022. Meta sought dismissal on grounds including that Khan should have recused herself from the vote of FTC commissioners to file the case, on the basis of her previous writing as a scholar and an analyst, which allegedly showed bias against Meta.

On February 23, 2022, Reuters reported that the FTC proposed a trial date of December 11, 2023 to allow for sufficient discovery. However, attorneys for Meta urged the court to delay the trial date to February 13, 2024.

Analysis 
William Kovacic, a former FTC chair, argued the case will be difficult to win as it would require the government to create a counter factual argument of an internet where Meta did not exist, and prove that it harmed competition or consumers.

Related cases 
On July 2022, the FTC filed a separate antitrust case against Meta over the company's planned acquisition of VR company Within.

See also 
 United States v. Google LLC, an antitrust suit filed in 2020
 Lawsuits involving Meta Platforms

References

External links
record of case at Federal Trade Commission
Judge Boasberg's Memorandum Opinion dismissing the complaint (June 28, 2021)
Judge Boasberg's Memorandum Opinion denying Facebook's motion to dismiss the amended complaint (January 11, 2022)

Facebook litigation
United States Court of Appeals for the Ninth Circuit cases
United States antitrust case law
2020 in United States case law
Federal Trade Commission litigation